This is a list of characters in the comic from the children's television programme Zzzap!. Aimed for hearing impaired children, the show was broadcast on ITV (later ITV1) and ITV2 (although it was later re-ran on CITV) between 8 January 1993 to 21 September 2001.

Cuthbert Lilly (1993–2001) 

Cuthbert Lilly is a well-meaning, yet clumsy and accident-prone man played by Richard Waites and aided with the catchphrase "He's Dead Silly". He had brown spiky hair and mostly wore a pink lily coloured suit with a yellow shirt, a red and white polka dot bow-tie and red shoes. Cuthbert is one of two characters (the other being The Handymen) to have appeared in every episode from Series 1 to Series 10. He was voiced by Neil Buchanan (who was also Smart Arty) from Series 2 to 9 (Series 1 had no voice acting and was composed entirely of Stock SFX and Music), and then by Richard Waites himself in Series 10.

His comic sound effect bubbles always appeared pink or lilac coloured from Series 2 onwards, in Series 1, they appeared in a variety of different colours. Cuthbert's scenes follow the general trend of a slapstick comedy, where Cuthbert generally fails to perform simple tasks with disastrous consequences. The sketches often featured the recurring characters of "Mr Snooty", Cuthbert's antagonist, and the "Old Lady" who frequently attacks Cuthbert with an umbrella. His trademark characteristic is putting his thumbs up (whether he had come out on top in a sketch or not). Two running gags throughout his sketches show Cuthbert reaching out and taking the comic book frame from the edges of the screen before throwing it away, as well as pushing it away, tripping over it or walking over it and Cuthbert repeatedly getting his hand crunched by anyone he tries to shake hands with.

Sometimes, if Cuthbert caused trouble, another person like an angry old lady or a policeman would chase after him. Before they did, he would stick his thumbs up to the camera, and then he would run off. 
Cuthbert is also a friend of Smart Arty and made a few cameos in his sketches mostly helping him solve a problem such as opening a pot of paint or looking after a baby.

In Series 1, Cuthbert was introduced with the camera travelling to visit his respective square, which showed a picture of Cuthbert with his thumbs up in the setting that the sketch would take place in. This was likely very impractical as his camera transition would've had to be filmed 10 times in succession, once for each episode of Series 1.

From Series 2 to 9, the square features Cuthbert bursting into his Title Card, which mended behind him (an effect possible because, to aid the camera operator in aligning shots with the comic frame, the shots began perfectly aligned with the panel and finished with a wide shot, which was then reversed in Post-production to play backwards) and in Series 10, frames containing the characters floated around the screen; the respective character's segment would continue when the roulette stopped at them. The following music was used in his sketches - Toytown, Clowns, Vintage Hollywood, Pony Trotting, Animal Capers, Ben Hill Billy, Coach Trip, Toy Car, String Holiday, Comedy Rag, English Country Garden, Banana Skin, Busy Days and Happy Oompah, all of which were production music. He was at the Top row on the left side.

Smart Arty (1993–1998) 

Smart Arty is a caricatured French painter who featured in Series 1 to Series 7 and was played by Neil Buchanan. Smart's trademark is to blow the unseen audience kisses at the beginning and end of every segment.

His comic sound effect bubbles always appeared dark pink. All of Smart Arty sketches began with him painting the same picture of himself. In Series 1, the sketches featured Smart creating large pictures out of rather unusual objects.
From Series 2 onwards, the sketches involved drawings created with a magic pen which brought his many drawings to life This was performed in the style of Maurice Minor sketches in Kenny Everett's shows and the cartoon Penny Crayon. his sketches were accompanied by the music of Boccherini's Menuet and Trio, from his ''String Quartet in E.

He is also a friend of Cuthbert Lilly and made a few cameos in his sketches mostly helping him solve problems such as photography and painting.

In recognition of ZZZAP one of the Art Attack 'Big Art Attack Pictures' featured on the show was a giant picture of Smart Arty.

Smart Arty would always do the same thing at the start of each sketch. He would always wave at the camera and would do 2 hops to the wall.

Smart Arty's first ever sketch on the program was in Series 1, Episode 1, when he made a black sellotape picture of Laurel and Hardy. His last ever sketch was in Series 7, Episode 16. The sketch showed him planting some seeds in his garden. He was at the Bottom Row on the right side.

The Handymen (1993–2001) 
The Handymen are two gloved hands; one yellow and one blue and were played by Sarah Pickthall. The Handymen are one of two segments of the show (the other being Cuthbert Lilly) to have appeared in every episode from Series 1 to Series 10.

The Handymen didn't have any comic sound effect bubbles. The sketches are performed in a theatre with an audience composed entirely of hands. The Handymen appear on stage, either making an object or performing a magic trick. Whenever the Handymen used an object to perform something, there would be a cardboard sign attached to it, stating what the object was.

A frequent characteristic of The Handymen were that, mostly between Series 1 to Series 7, but sporadically thereafter, a cardboard sign on a white stick describing an instruction, step, object or passage of time would stay in shot slightly too long, and one of the hands would tap the sign, prompting it to leave the scene.

The Handymen had the same music in all of their sketches from Series 1 to Series 7, but in Series 8 to 10 the featured music varied each episode. but every now and than the original theme was played. The Handymen were at the Top Row on the right side.

Tricky Dicky's Mission Impossible (1993) 

Tricky Dicky is a mysterious spy played by Richard Waites and was featured in Series 1. He was always seen wearing a black hat, a mask, a grey trench coat and black plimsolls. He would sometimes wear wellies in the event of a muddy task. His trademark was a very high and slightly creepy giggle. His eyes only appeared at the beginning of his sketches.

His comic sound effect bubbles appeared in different colors such as black, white, blue and green. His sketches involved him in his secret office, writing a challenge on his typewriter, that would then have to be performed by a selection of children. The challenges initially sounded simple (for example, having to pour custard on a pudding), but they featured a twist that made it more difficult (i.e. the custard might be in a wheelbarrow and the pudding at the end of an obstacle course) The children would often give a black and white speech bubble of "Oh No!" and Tricky Dicky would hold up a speech bubble sign saying "Oh Yes!". Depending on whether the children failed or succeeded in completing the task, at the end of the sketch Tricky would hold up a sign reading - "Mission Impossible" or "Mission Possible" respectively.
The character of Tricky Dicky was dropped after Series 1, as the character was deemed too scary for younger viewers. He was in the centre in the middle below the clown square.

Daisy Dares You (1994–2001) 

Daisy Dare was featured in Series 2 to 10 and was the replacement for Tricky Dicky. She was played by Deborah McCallum for Series 2 to 8 and Claire Macaulay for Series 9 and 10. Daisy was always seen wearing yellow and black checks, and was supposedly a young, freckled, cheeky schoolgirl in dungarees. Her hair was always tied into her trademark style of two bunches, secured with yellow bows. Her trademark walk was a playful skip.

Her comic sound effect bubbles always appeared canary yellow. Much like the Tricky Dicky sketches featured in the first series, Daisy would set difficult challenges for a small group of children who were selected from local schools or drama organisations. If even one of the children succeeded in performing the challenge, Daisy would start to cry or throw a tantrum; but if they all failed, Daisy would laugh and celebrate her victory. From Series 8 onwards, Daisy had to do the challenge herself if the kids succeeded. She would get covered in mouldy food or would fall into the swimming pool. If she fell in, the kids laughed and said hurrah.

In the last episode of Series 2 to Series 10, Daisy would set children a task where they would get themselves in trouble (usually by throwing food or gunge balloons at a policeman, some old ladies, or angry members of the public) but the plan would usually backfire and get Daisy into trouble. Daisy would also whistle to give the children a signal to perform. She is also a friend of Minnie Magic as she is seen in one of Minnie's sketches, coming to visit her for tea. She also appeared in one of Cuthbert Lilly's sketches where he was attempting to get her a present for her birthday; and in one of Smart Arty's sketches to hand him a party invitation. She is in the centre of the middle row, below the clown/dot to dot square.

Daisy was one of the show's most popular characters and also one of the longest-running. In Series 2 to 7, she was voiced by Neil Buchanan (who was also Smart Arty). In Series 8 onwards, she was voiced by Sophie Aldred (who was also Minnie Magic).

Minnie The Mini Magician (1999–2001) 

Minnie Magic was played by Sophie Aldred and was featured in Series 8 to 10. She was Smart Arty's replacement after Neil Buchanan left the role at the end of Series 7. 
Minnie was a magician in training who wore an L-plate around her neck to show this. She had a mop of curly orange hair, freckles and wore black rimmed circular glasses. Minnie's main attire consisted of a purple magician's robe with a yellow collar, decorated with yellow stars and spots with a matching hat and bloomers, along with black and white striped leggings and purple shoes.

Her comic sound effect bubbles always appeared orange. Minnie often uses her magic performances to try out new things, make new discoveries or just to do a simple task, but they usually go wrong or backfire on her, and whenever they did, she would sigh her catchphrase of "Oh well!" before tapping her learner sign. Sometimes she succeeds and twiddles her glasses, saying her other catchphrase "Magic!" She is also a friend of Daisy Dare as seen in one of her sketches when she invited her to tea. She is at the Bottom Row on the Right Side.

Other Pages 
 Question Mark (Puzzle Page)
 Dot to Dot
 Eye (Spot the Difference)
 Eyes in Leaves (Guess the Animal)
 Magnifying Glass (Dingbats)

ZZZap!
ZZZap!